Giammattei is a surname. Notable people with the surname include:

Alejandro Giammattei (born 1956), Guatemalan politician
Marcela Giammattei, Guatemalan lawyer and politician, daughter of Alejandro